The Southport Leagues Club is a rugby league club based in Southport, Queensland, Australia. The primary charter of SLCL is the promotion of Rugby league within the Gold Coast community and the operation of a profitable sporting club that reinvests in Rugby League and the local community.

History 
Southport Leagues Club Limited (SLCL) has been an integral part of the Gold Coast Rugby League scene and community since the 1930s when it was originally called the Southport Wanderers. This has positioned SLCL as a leading community-based sporting organisation based on the Gold Coast in Queensland.

Rugby League 
The Southport Tigers Senior Rugby League Football Club is a member of Queensland Rugby League (QRL) and plays in the Gold Coast competition. 
The primary teams currently consist of Under 19s, Reserve Grade and First Grade.

See also

 Sports on the Gold Coast, Queensland
 Southport Tigers

External links
Southport Leagues Club Official Website

Sports venues on the Gold Coast, Queensland
Southport, Queensland
Rugby league on the Gold Coast, Queensland
Clubs and societies in Queensland